was the pen-name of Yosano Hiroshi, a Japanese author and poet active in late Meiji, Taishō, and early Shōwa period Japan. His wife was fellow author Yosano Akiko. Cabinet minister and politician Kaoru Yosano is his grandson.

Early life
Yosano was born in Kyoto as the son of Buddhist priest, and was a graduate of Keio University. After graduation, he taught Japanese language for four years at Tokuyama Girls' School, in what is now Shunan city, Yamaguchi prefecture. He was forced to quit over alleged improprieties with one of his students. At the age of 20, he moved to Tokyo. He supported himself as a staff writer for Tokyo newspapers. On 11 May 1894, he published a strongly worded article encouraging the reform of traditional Japanese poetry, or waka, to give it more originality and thus make it more popular.

Literary career
Yosano was a disciple of Ochiai Naobumi, and a prominent founding member of the latter's Asaka Society.

In 1900, Yosano founded the literary magazine Myōjō (Bright Star), and soon collected a circle of famous poets, including Kitahara Hakushū, Yoshii Isamu and Ishikawa Takuboku. The magazine was immediately popular with young poets who shared Yosano's enthusiasm for revitalizing waka through the medium of tanka poetry. One of the earliest contributors to his magazine was a young woman named Hō Shō, better known by her pen-name (after her marriage to Yosano) Yosano Akiko.

Yosano's own works include Bokoku no on (Sounds of a Decaying Country, 1894), which despite its title was a collection of literary criticism, and Tōzai namboku (East-west, north–south, 1896), an anthology of his poetry, mostly tanka, but also several shintaishi and renga.

Yosano is also one of the five authors of the essays 5 Pairs of Shoes.

See also

 Japanese literature
 List of Japanese authors
 Yosa District, Kyoto - Tekkan's father's birthplace. The origin of Tekkan's family name Yosano.

References

Itsumi Kumi, ed.Yosano Hiroshi Akiko shokan shusei, Yagi Shoten, Shohan edition, 2001,

External links 

 e-texts of Tekkan's works at Aozora bunko
 DIJ-Deutsches Institut für Japanstudien
 YOSANO Tekkan Portraits of Modern Japanese Historical Figures｜National Diet Library,Japan

1873 births
1935 deaths
20th-century Japanese poets
Writers from Kyoto
People of Meiji-period Japan
19th-century Japanese poets
Japanese male poets
20th-century Japanese male writers
Jōdo Shinshū Buddhist priests